Samair was a charter airline based in Bratislava, Slovakia, operated charter flights out of M. R. Štefánik Airport. It was founded in 2010 inheritor of Central Charter Airlines Slovakia.

Destinations
Samair operated flights from Bratislava, Brno, Budapest, Košice and Sliač to the following destinations:

Africa
   Egypt
Hurghada - Hurghada Airport
   Morocco
Agadir 
   Tunisia
Monastir - Habib Bourguiba Airport

Europe
   Bulgaria
Burgas - Burgas Airport
   Greece
Corfu 
Heraklion - Heraklion International Airport
Keffalinia
Kos - Kos Island International Airport
Thessaloniki 
Zakynthos - Zakynthos International Airport
   Hungary
Budapest - Budapest Ferenc Liszt International Airport	
   Romania
Cluj-Napoca - Cluj-Napoca International Airport (begins 25 October 2013)
   Turkey
Antalya - Antalya Airport
Izmir - Adnan Menderes Airport
Rhodes Diagoras Airport

Fleet
As of March 2012, Samair has four Boeing 737-400.

References

External links

Defunct airlines of Slovakia
Airlines established in 2010
Airlines disestablished in 2014
Defunct charter airlines
Slovakian companies established in 2010